Odostomia unidens is a species of sea snail, a marine gastropod mollusc in the family Pyramidellidae, the pyrams and their allies.

This species is also considered a synonym of Odostomia plicata (Montagu, 1803).

References

External links
 To World Register of Marine Species

unidens
Gastropods described in 1848